G. Balasubramanian  served as the Vice-Chancellor of Tamil University, Thanjavur, in Tamil Nadu, India, from 4 October 2018 to 3 October 2021.

Birth 
He was born on 15 April 1959 at Kaduvakkudi village in Mannargudi taluk in Thiruvarur district of Tamil Nadu. He did his M.A., in Linguistics (1983) and in Tamil literature (1989) and Ph.D., in Madurai Kamaraj University.

Profession
He worked as Research Fellow and Research Associate (1987–89) in Department of Ancient Industries of Tamil University, Thanjavur, Tamil Nadu Lecturer and Reader (1989-2006) in Linguistics (Tamil), Department of Malayalam of University of Calicut, Kerala, Associate Professor and Professor (2006-2009, 2011–16) and Rector (2016–18) in Department of Dravidian and Computational Linguistics, of Dravidian University, Kuppam, Andhra Pradesh, Visiting Professor of Tamil in Department of South Asian Studies, of Faculty of Oriental Studies, Warsaw University, Poland (2009–11) He wrote many research articles on Linguistics and Tamilology.

Research works

Other Academic visits
 Visited Charles University in Prague as Consultant for the Project on Pandanus, 30 July - 4 August 2011
 External Examiner for BATL, SIM/SUSS University, Singapore, 4–7 October 2015, 5–6 October 2016 and 9–10 October 2017
 Participated and presented a paper in the International Conference on `Dictionaries in Asia: Research and Pedagogical Implications‟, held at Hong Kong University of Science and Technology, Hong Kong, 26-29 March 1997

Translation
He knew Tamil (Mother Tongue), English, Malayalam and Telugu (working knowledge). He translated many articles from Tamil to Malayalam and vice versa.

Other works
His projects include Survey, Documentation and Revitalization of Endangered Languages in the Border Districts of Chittoor of Andhra Pradesh, Krishnagiri of Tamil Nadu and Kolar of Karnataka (UGC, 2015-2020), Border area Bilingualism of Tamil Nadu and Andhra Pradesh : A Study of Language Attitudes, Language Use and Convergence (UGC, 2015-2019), Malama:kku: A Linguistic Description and Assessment of Language Endangerment (UGC), Language of Malakka:ran: Phonology with Vocabulary (Dravidian University, 2007–08) and Linguistic Description of Mahl (Lakshadweep Socio-cultural Research Commission, 2001–02) He presented and published more than 20 research articles in national and international level.

Books
 	Translated Zero Degree, the Tamil Novel (by Charu Nivedita) from Tamil into Malayalam, (Co-translator: P.M.Girish), Current Books, Thrissur, First Impression, September 2001
 	Studies in Linguistics, Prof.T.B.Venugopala Panicker Felicitation Volume, (Ed) University of Calicut, 2006
 	Translated the book Flowers and Formulas (by Jaroslav Vacek) from English into Tamil as Saṅga Ilakkiyattil iyaṟkaikKuṟiyiiṭu:Ainthiṇai Malarkaḷum, Marapukaḷum,, Adayalam, Putthanattham, I Edition, 2015 
 	Moziyiyal oppu Nōkku,, Sri Venkateswara Publications, Kuppam, I Edition, 2018
 	Reflections in Applied Linguistics, Excel India Publishers, New Delhi, First Impression, August 2018

Awards
 State Teacher Award for 2013(Government of Andhra Pradesh)

References

External links
 New VC for Tamil varsity, The Hindu, 30 September 2018
 முதலமைச்சர் எடப்பாடி பழனிச்சாமியை தஞ்சை தமிழ் பல்கலை. துணைவேந்தர் சந்திப்பு, தந்தி டிவி, 1 அக்டோபர் 2018

1959 births
Living people
Scholars from Tamil Nadu
Indian Tamil academics
Heads of universities and colleges in India
Academic staff of the University of Calicut
Madurai Kamaraj University alumni
People from Thiruvarur